"Rico Suave" is a 1990 single by Ecuadorian rapper and singer Gerardo. It appeared on his 1991 album Mo' Ritmo. The track peaked at number 7 on the Billboard Hot 100 chart of April 13, 1991, and reached number 2 on the Hot Rap Singles chart a week earlier. In the song, the narrator tells of his luck with women and his lady-loving lifestyle.

The song ranks number 100 on VH1's "100 Greatest Songs of the 90s" and number 9 on VH1's "100 Greatest One Hit Wonders". It also ranked at number 37 on Blenders list of the "50 Worst Songs Ever".

The song contains samples of "Give It Up or Turnit a Loose" by James Brown and "Chamo Candela" by Venezuelan tropical/dance pop group Daiquiri.

Track listing

Maxi-CD single
 "Rico Suave" (Spanglish version) – 3:29
 "Rico Suave" (Mo' Ritmo dance version) – 7:15
 "Rico Suave" (all Spanish version) – 4:17

12" single
 "Rico Suave" (Spanglish version) – 4:09
 "Rico Suave" (The More English Edit) – 3:29
 "Rico Suave" (Mo' Ritmo dance version) – 7:15
 "Rico Suave" (Spanish version) – 4:17

Remix single
 "Rico Suave" – 4:09
 "Rico Suave" (Spanish version) – 4:17
 "Rico Suave" (Instrumental Energize Mix) – 4:09

Music video
The video for the single features Gerardo and several male back-up dancers. Gerardo wears an open leather jacket. The backup dancers wear white T-shirts under their oversized suit jackets.

The video's intro consists of the singer and two back-up dancers squatting in front of a skyscraper with their backs to the camera. Near the end of the video, Gerardo takes his jacket off.

The bilingual version of the video also details Gerardo's encounter with his date's parents, who appear less than thrilled with Gerardo.

The video was nominated for two MTV Video Music Awards for Best Male Video and Best New Artist.

Charts

Weekly charts

Year-end charts

Certifications

References

1990 debut singles
1991 singles
Spanglish songs
1990 songs